The Aquarium of Rhodes is a research centre, aquarium and museum in Rhodes, Greece. It was built in the 1930s, when the island was under the Italian rule and is currently administered by the National Centre of Marine Research.

History

The building, an Art deco design by the Italian architect , was constructed between 1934 and 1935. When it first started operations in 1937, it was named the Reale Istituto di Ricerce Biologiche di Rodi (Royal Biological Research Institute of Rhodes). Research here included the hydrology, sponges, and fisheries of the Aegean.

When the island was handed back to Greece in 1945, the facility was operated as part of the "Hellenic Hydrobiological Institute". Since 1963 it has been known as the  "Hydrobiological Station of Rhodes", and is  administered by the National Centre of Marine Research. An exhibition area was added to the north side of the building in 1971–72.

Layout

The aquarium is in the basement of the building, and is a corridor designed to look like an underwater cave. The displays include sea anemones and plants, octopuses, sea urchins, corals, bivalves, crabs, lobsters, sea turtles, dolphins, seals, mollusks, sharks, and many other fish. There is a separate holding facility for incoming specimens and organisms that need special handling, where the facility also cares for sea turtles and seals that have been injured nearby.

References

External links

Aquaria in Greece
Buildings and structures in Rhodes (city)
Museums in Rhodes
Natural history museums in Greece
Dodecanese under Italian rule
Italian fascist architecture